Tubulicrinis is a genus of crust fungi in the family Hymenochaetaceae. The genus was circumscribed by Dutch mycologist Marinus Anton Donk in 1956.

Species

References

Hymenochaetales
Taxa named by Marinus Anton Donk